The South Africa national soccer team represents South Africa in men's international soccer and it is run by the South African Football Association, the governing body for Soccer in South Africa. The team's nickname is Bafana Bafana (The Boys/Go boys go boys), and South Africa's home ground is FNB Stadium, which is located in Johannesburg. The team's greatest result was winning the Africa Cup of Nations at home in 1996. The team is a member of both FIFA and Confederation of African Football (CAF).

Having played their first match in 1906, they returned to the world stage in 1992, after 16 years of being banned from FIFA, and 40 years of effective suspension due to the apartheid system. South Africa became the first African nation to host the FIFA World Cup when it was granted host status for the 2010 edition. The team's Siphiwe Tshabalala was also the first player to score in this World Cup during the opening game against Mexico, which was followed by an iconic Macarena-style goal celebration from five South African players. Despite defeating France 2–1 in their final game of the Group Stage, they failed to progress from the first round of the tournament, becoming the first host nation in the history of the FIFA World Cup to exit in the group stage, followed by Qatar in 2022. The team was ranked 20th out of 32 sides that participated. As of the 23 June 2022, the team is ranked 12th in Africa (CAF) and has moved one spot up in the world (FIFA) and is currently in the 67th position.

History

Pre-1992
Soccer first arrived in South Africa through colonialism in the late nineteenth century, as the game was popular among British soldiers. From the earliest days of the sport in South Africa until the end of apartheid, organised soccer was affected by the country's system of racial segregation. The all-white Football Association of South Africa (FASA) was formed in 1892, while the South African Indian Football Association (SAIFA), the South African Bantu Football Association (SABFA) and the South African Coloured Football Association (SACFA) were founded in 1903, 1933 and 1936 respectively.

In 1903 the SAFA re-affiliated with the English Football Association after the Second Boer War between the British Empire and the Boer state. There was a plan to play a tournament held in Argentina, with South Africa and Fulham as guest teams, but it was not carried out. Nevertheless, South Africa traveled to South America in 1906 to play a series of friendly matches there.

South Africa played a total of 12 matches in South America, winning 11 with 60 goals scored and only 7 conceded. Some of the rivals were Belgrano A.C., Argentina national team, a Liga Rosarina combined, Estudiantes (BA) and Quilmes. The only team that could beat South Africa was the Argentine Alumni by 1–0 at Sociedad Sportiva stadium of Buenos Aires, on 24 June, although the South Africans would take revenge on 22 July, defeating the Alumni by 2–0.

The players were exclusively white, civil servants, government employees, bankers and civil engineers. Seven of the 15 players were born in South Africa and 8 originated from England and Scotland.

South Africa was one of four African nations to attend FIFA's 1953 congress, at which the four demanded, and won, representation on the FIFA executive committee. Thus the four nations (South Africa, Ethiopia, Egypt and Sudan) founded the Confederation of African Football in 1956, and the South African representative, Fred Fell, sat at the first meeting as a founding member. It soon became clear however that South Africa's constitution prohibited racially mixed teams from competitive sport, and so they could only send either an all-black side or an all-white side to the planned 1957 African Cup of Nations. This was unacceptable to the other members of the Confederation, and South Africa was disqualified from the competition, however, some sources say that they withdrew voluntarily.

At the second CAF conference in 1958, South Africa were formally expelled from CAF. The all-white FASA were admitted to FIFA in the same year, but in August 1960 it was given an ultimatum of one year to fall in line with the non-discriminatory regulations of FIFA. On 26 September 1961 at the annual FIFA conference, the South African association was formally suspended from FIFA. Sir Stanley Rous, president of The Football Association of England and a champion of South Africa's FIFA membership, was elected FIFA President a few days later. Rous was adamant that sport, and FIFA in particular, should not embroil itself in political matters and against fierce opposition, he continued to resist attempts to expel South Africa from FIFA. The suspension was lifted in January 1963 after a visit to South Africa by Rous in order to investigate the state of soccer in the country.

Rous declared that if the suspension were not lifted, soccer there would be discontinued, possibly to the point of no recovery. The next annual conference of FIFA in October 1964 took place in Tokyo and was attended by a larger contingent of representatives from African and Asian associations and here the suspension of South Africa's membership was re-imposed. In 1976, after the Soweto uprising, they were formally expelled from FIFA.

In 1991, when the apartheid system was beginning to be demolished, a new multi-racial South African Football Association was formed, and admitted to FIFA – and thus finally allowing South Africa to enter the qualifying stages for subsequent World Cups.

1992–1994: Readmission
After spending nearly two decades in international isolation, the South African national team played its first game on 7 July 1992, beating Cameroon 1–0 at Kings Park in Durban.

The team entered the 1994 Africa Cup of Nations qualifiers and was placed in Group 5, along with Mauritius, Zambia and Zimbabwe. They won one game, away to Mauritius, and drew with Mauritius and Zimbabwe at home. The team finished third in the group and failed to qualify.

For the 1994 FIFA World Cup qualifiers South Africa was placed in Group D, along with Congo, Libya and Nigeria. Libya withdrew from the qualifiers. South Africa beat Congo home and away. They drew with Nigeria at home and lost away. South Africa finished second in the group, and failed to qualify for the next stage of the qualifiers.

1996–1998: Rise
In 1996, a mere 5 years after readmission, South Africa achieved their finest moment when they hosted (and won) the 1996 Africa Cup of Nations, in the process reaching the lofty heights of 16th in the FIFA rankings. The shock firing of Cup of Nations winning coach Clive Barker did little to slow momentum as they followed their 1996 success with a second-place finish at the 1998 Africa Cup of Nations after Egypt under Jomo Sono. The team had earned their first appearance at the FIFA World Cup, qualifying for France '98. Under head coach Philippe Troussier, South Africa suffered a heavy 3–0 defeat to hosts France in their World Cup debut, but played credibly against other group opponents Denmark and Asian juggernauts Saudi Arabia, earning 1–1 and 2–2 draws respectively on their way to an early exit.

2000–2002: Peak and coaching instability
Following their successful 1996 and 1998 Africa Cup of Nations' campaigns and their World Cup debut in 1998, South Africa were seen as a growing power on the continent. Under the coaching of the newly hired Trott Moloto they would start the decade off strongly, finishing third in the 2000 edition of the Africa Cup of Nations, but as was increasingly symptomatic of soccer in South Africa at the national level, yet another coaching change was made. Portuguese Carlos Queiroz was hired as the man to take South Africa to the 2002 FIFA World Cup. South Africa qualified for the 2002 Africa Cup of Nations and were eliminated in the quarter-finals against hosts Mali. In the run-up to the 2002 FIFA World Cup, for which South Africa had easily qualified as winners of Group E, Queiroz left his post as head coach amid increasing behind-the-scenes political wrangling.

Former legend Jomo Sono was brought back in a caretaker capacity to lead South Africa in Korea/Japan. Placed in Group B along with Spain, Paraguay and debutants Slovenia at the 2002 FIFA World Cup, South Africa had high hopes of progressing to the knockout phase of the tournament. After earning a 2–2 draw against Paraguay in their opening game with a last-gasp penalty from Quinton Fortune and following it up with their first-ever victory at the finals with a 1–0 win over Slovenia, South Africa headed into their final game against Spain second in the group and 3 points clear of Paraguay and Slovenia. In arguably the game of the group, in which 5 goals were scored inside the hour, South Africa twice came from a goal down in an agonising 3–2 defeat to the Spanish. In the other game, which kicked off at the same time as the South Africa-Spain game, Paraguay found themselves beating Slovenia 2–1, but the result was not enough for Paraguay to surpass South Africa in the standings as South Africa's goal difference of zero was superior to Paraguay's minus one. But South African hearts would be broken. With 84 minutes gone in the Slovenia-Paraguay game Nelson Cuevas bagged a vital third goal for Paraguay, giving Paraguay a 3–1 victory over Slovenia. The win left both Paraguay and South Africa level on 4 points with the late Cuevas strike against Slovenia lifting Paraguay's goal difference to zero, level with South Africa's. The deciding factor moved onto a third tiebreaker; goals scored, and as Paraguay had scored six goals to South Africa's five, they progressed to the Round of 16 at the expense of South Africa. What made the early exit all the more heartbreaking was that South Africa was the only team in the group that managed to hold its own against runaway group winners Spain, as both Slovenia and Paraguay were comfortably cast aside 3–1 by the Spanish.

This era (1996–2002) of rising soccer prowess saw South Africa blessed with fine footballers such as record-setting goalscorers Benni McCarthy & Shaun Bartlett, defensive hardmen and inspirational captains Lucas Radebe & Neil Tovey, creative maestros John Moshoeu & Doctor Khumalo and defensive stalwart Mark Fish.

2002–2006: Decline and coaching roundabout
In the period following the 2002 World Cup and leading up to the 2006 FIFA World Cup, South Africa would go through 4 head coaches; Ephraim Mashaba (2002–2004), April Phumo (2004), Stuart Baxter (2004–2005), Ted Dumitru (2005–2006) and caretaker Pitso Mosimane (2006). Neither coach was able to match the successes seen in the period 1996–2002 as South Africa failed to progress beyond the group stages in either the 2004 Africa Cup of Nations or 2006 Africa Cup of Nations, failing to register a single goal in the latter. Above all though, South Africa failed to qualify for the 2006 FIFA World Cup. After being placed in Group 2 for qualifying, South Africa were beaten to Germany by Ghana. Following poor performances in both the 2004 and 2006 Africa Cup of Nations, rumours circulated that SAFA had been attempting to attract a high-profile international manager to coach Bafana Bafana and that former England boss Sven-Göran Eriksson had been targeted. This rumour however has been denied.

2007–2010: Hosting the World Cup

By failing to register a single goal at the 2006 Africa Cup of Nations and by missing out on Germany 2006, local supporters had become increasingly unhappy with the decline in the performance of the national team. In light of these poor performances, it was decided that the hiring of a more experienced manager was essential. Former World Cup-winner and Brazil national team coach Carlos Alberto Parreira was approached for the job and he accepted. He signed a R100 million contract covering four years. His term as manager started 1 January 2007 targeting the 2010 FIFA World Cup, which South Africa had been awarded the right to host, becoming the first African nation to ever host association football's global showpiece.

Under Parreira, with his rich history of success at the international level, South Africa was expected to improve, but early signs were not good as they would exit the 2008 Africa Cup of Nations at the first hurdle once again. To make matters worse, Parreira stood down as coach in April 2008 due to family reasons. Joel Santana was hand-picked by Parreira to succeed him and he was signed to coach the team until 2010. Under Santana South Africa would slide into its darkest period in international soccer since readmission. Failing to even qualify for the 2010 Africa Cup of Nations with soccer characterised by a complete lack of creativity and little goal-scoring threat, South Africa tumbled down the FIFA rankings and was at one point not even ranked among Africa's top-10 nations. Santana was fired in 2009 and Parreira would return in time for the 2009 FIFA Confederations Cup – also hosted by South Africa – and South Africa would see an improvement in performance, holding its own against eventual world champions Spain and perennial powerhouse Brazil, the latter requiring an 88th-minute goal to overcome South Africa in the semi-finals. South Africa would ultimately finish 4th, following a thrilling 3–2 loss to the Spanish in the 3rd/4th Place Playoff.

A string of victories, albeit against marginal opposition, in the run-up to the 2010 FIFA World Cup seemed to instill a sense of confidence in the team as well as the nation. For the 2010 World Cup, the first in Africa, South Africa was placed in Group A, along with Mexico, surprise package and eventual semi-finalists Uruguay and former world champions France. South Africa played the first game, which opened the World Cup 2010 tournament with a 1–1 draw against Mexico after taking the lead through a long-range Siphiwe Tshabalala strike. Katlego Mphela would hit the post late into the game as South Africa, buoyed by a frenzied home crowd, so very nearly opened the tournament with a win. A heavy 3–0 defeat in the second group game against Uruguay and a Mexican win over France left South Africa with a mountain to climb in order to progress beyond the group stage. For the deciding match against France, Parreira would discard his previous tactics of a defensive-minded five-man midfield and a lone forward in favour of a more attacking formation utilising two forwards, as up until the France game South Africa had focused more on not losing than they did on trying to win, but the heavy defeat against Uruguay coupled with Mexico's victory over France had now left them with a goal difference of negative three that needed to be overcome in order for them to progress. South Africa would also require a favour from Uruguay, needing the Uruguayans to inflict a sizeable defeat on Mexico to aid their chances of progress. The change in tactics worked as South Africa gained the upper hand over the French, attacking at will. At the half, South Africa had a 2–0 lead thanks to goals from Bongani Khumalo and Katlego Mphela while Uruguay were beating Mexico 1–0 in the other group game. As it stood, South Africa needed at least one more goal against France while Uruguay needed to double their lead against Mexico. It was not to be as while South Africa did secure a historic victory over France, they failed to score again and conceded a late goal for a 2–1 victory while the Uruguayans had failed to add to their lead, as they ran out 1–0 victors over Mexico. For the second World Cup in a row, South Africa finished level on points with second place but were eliminated, this time on goal difference while it had been on goals scored in 2002. Elimination in the group stage made South Africa the first host to fail to progress beyond the first round of a World Cup.

Following the conclusion of the World Cup and the expiration of his contract, Carlos Alberto Parreira announced his retirement from coaching. As part of his contract, Parreira had also drawn up a plan of recommendations extending as far as soccer development at grassroots level that SAFA was encouraged to review in the hopes of reviving the fortunes of the national soccer team. Pitso Mosimane, who had been Parreira's assistant, was selected as the new head coach with Parreira's blessings.

2012–2014: Continued struggles
South Africa failed to qualify for the Africa Cup of Nations finals after the rules were misread. They ultimately played for and achieved a draw at home in Nelspruit against Sierra Leone in a game they needed to win, when news about Niger trailing in Egypt was received, leading to the qualification of Niger at their expense, and also at Sierra Leone's. They then celebrated at the end as if they had qualified, making it the second time they would be so embarrassed in 4 years after qualifying as a lucky 3rd and last best runners-up for the 2008 edition, with Zambia catapulting over South Africa as Group winners after a 3–1 win in Cape Town – and thereby gaining an automatic qualifying ticket on the head-to-head record with the South Africans erroneously thinking goal difference would be the primary tie-breaker.

The SABC also announced that the team had qualified and the SAFA president Kirsten Nematandani then congratulated the team on TV before realisation dawned. SAFA said they would appeal to CAF but the appeal was later withdrawn.

South Africa continued to disappoint into 2012, opening the year with a lacklustre 0–0 draw away to 2012 Africa Cup of Nations co-hosts Equatorial Guinea. This would be the start of a run that would see Bafana Bafana rack up 6 successive draws to start the year. The run of draws included 1–1, 0–0 and 1–1 draws at home to African champions Zambia, Ghana and Senegal respectively in International Friendlies. Following a 1–1 draw at home to Ethiopia in a 2014 World Cup qualifier, head coach Pitso Mosimane was fired. The draw increased South Africa's streak to 7 games without a win. Mosimane was replaced as head coach by Steve Komphela on an interim basis while SAFA interviewed potential candidates to fill the post on a permanent basis.

In his first game in charge as interim head coach, Komphela oversaw yet another uninspired performance in South Africa's second World Cup qualifier against Botswana as they drew yet again, extending their winless run to 8 games. Bafana Bafana finally tasted victory when they defeated Gabon 3–0 at home in a friendly, ending their winless streak.

Komphela, along with Gordon Igesund, Gavin Hunt, Neil Tovey and Ephraim Shakes Mashaba had been shortlisted as one of the candidates to be the next head coach of South Africa, with Komphela and Igesund emerging as the front-runners. On 30 June 2012, Gordon Igesund was appointed as the new head coach.

Following the crisis in Libya throughout 2011, CAF made the decision to move the 2013 Africa Cup of Nations from Libya – who were the original hosts – to South Africa on the grounds of safety and security. Libya was then given the right to host the 2017 edition of the tournament, which was originally awarded to South Africa. As hosts of the 2013 Africa Cup of Nations, South Africa would automatically qualify for the competition.

South Africa, as hosts, were seeded and drawn in Group A along with Angola, Morocco and tournament debutants Cape Verde.

South Africa kicked the tournament off on 19 January against debutants Cape Verde at a wet National Stadium. South Africa made use of a defensive formation as coach Gordon Igesund deployed two deep midfielders in Kagisho Dikgacoi and Reneilwe Letsholonyane and along with the poor weather conditions delivered an uninspired performance resulting in a 0–0 draw. In the hosts' second group game against Angola, coach Igesund dropped his midfield pairing of Dikgacoi and Letsholonyane and opted for a new midfield pairing of the defensive minded Dean Furman and the more attacking May Mahlangu.  The result was a far more confident display as Dean Furman took control of the midfield – something that was lacking in the first game – and delivered a man of the match performance.  South Africa ran out winners with goals from Siyabonga Sangweni and Lehlohonolo Majoro setting up a 2–0 victory.  Heading into the final group game against Morocco South Africa only had to avoid defeat in order to progress to the knockout stages while Morocco needed a win to progress. South Africa put in a woeful first-half performance that saw them 1–0 down at halftime and struggling with the Moroccans' direct approach. It was only thanks to the heroics of goalkeeper Itumeleng Khune, who pulled off a string of stunning saves, that South Africa were not further behind. An improved second half saw South Africa fight back with an equaliser from May Mahlangu, but South Africa continued to look vulnerable against Morocco's direct approach and subsequently fell behind again in the 81st minute. But typical of their improved tenacity in the second half South Africa swiftly responded through a Siyabonga Sangweni equaliser in the 86th minute. South Africa hung on to the draw, with the result enough to see them win group A and progress to the quarterfinals. Sangweni's late equaliser would prove vital as an injury time winner by Cape Verde in their final game against Angola would have seen Morocco and Cape Verde progress at the expense of South Africa, but as it was South Africa went through along with Cape Verde, who enjoyed a stunning debut in Africa's showpiece tournament.

South Africa were drawn against Group B runners-up Mali in the quarterfinals. South Africa delivered a stunning first-half performance, playing at a high tempo to negate the Malians' superior physical presence. Unable to keep up with the pace of the game, Mali were overwhelmed as South Africa carved out chance after chance, finally making the breakthrough in the 31st minute as Thuso Phala drove into the box and fired a low cross across the goalmouth which an open Tokelo Rantie pounced on. South Africa headed into the break 1–0 up. However, in the second half, led by veteran midfielder and captain Seydou Keita, the Malians began to impose themselves and equalised in the 58th minute amid a momentary defensive collapse as the South African defense allowed captain Keita to head home an unchallenged cross. From that point on it was Mali that controlled the game. Neither side was able to secure a winner and the game headed into extra time. After another goalless 30 minutes, the game moved to penalties. Siphiwe Tshabalala took the first penalty and gave South Africa the lead with a stunningly placed shot into the top left corner. Cheick Diabaté would swiftly respond. Then South Africa's tournament proceeded to unravel. Dean Furman was next up for South Africa but he saw his weak shot easily saved by goalkeeper Soumbeïla Diakité. Adama Tamboura would score Mali's second penalty handing them the advantage. In an almost carbon copy of Furman's penalty, May Mahlangu's penalty was also easily saved low to the left by goalkeeper Diakité. Mahamane Traoré confidently dispatched Mali's third penalty, handing them a comfortable 3–1 cushion. Lehlohonolo Majoro was next up for South Africa but the pressure was too much as he fired a wild shot high and to the right of the goal. With the miss, South Africa were eliminated from the tournament 3–1 on penalties.

After a poor 2012 in which South Africa had performed poorly and had steadily slid down FIFA's rankings, their performance in the 2013 Africa Cup of Nations was a marked improvement. Although coach Gordon Igesund had been handed the almost impossible task of a semifinal berth as a target in his contract, SAFA came out and said the signs of improvement were sufficient enough for Igesund's job to remain safe.

South Africa received a First Round bye when the qualifying process for the 2014 FIFA World Cup got underway on 30 July 2011. For the Second Round of the qualifying process, South Africa was placed in Pot 1 as a top-seeded nation for the draw from where they were drawn into Group A, along with neighbors Botswana, the Central African Republic and Ethiopia. South Africa opened their qualifying campaign with a dismal performance, struggling to overcome a one-goal deficit in a 1–1 home draw with Ethiopia, a nation ranked nearly 70 places below them. This result, coupled with the less than an inspiring string of results that had seen South Africa winless in the past 6 outings that preceded it, resulted in the sacking of head coach Pitso Mosimane. Under interim head coach Steve Khompela, South Africa played out to yet another uninspiring 1–1 draw, this time away to Botswana.

Following on from a positive display in the 2013 Africa Cup of Nations, Gordon Igesund guided South Africa to their first victory in the 2014 World Cup qualifiers as they beat the Central African Republic 2–0 in Cape Town. South Africa continued their push for a place at the World Cup with a 3–0 win over the Central African Republic on 8 June. South Africa endured a difficult build-up to the game as they were only able to practice once before the game due to a delayed connecting flight, but they performed admirably against their physical opponents on a bumpy pitch. The win was South Africa's first away win in a World Cup qualifier since 2005. Ethiopia also won their match away to Botswana on the same day, maintaining their 2-point lead over South Africa.

South Africa and Ethiopia met in a potential group decider in Addis Ababa on 16 June, with the Ethiopians going undefeated at home in 12 games. South Africa were under pressure from the kick-off and as early as the 3rd-minute goalkeeper Itumeleng Khune was forced into a stunning save. South Africa would recover to take a 1–0 lead through a stunning left-footed half volley from Bernard Parker in the 33rd minute. The lead was short-lived as Ethiopia equalised in the 44th minute following a defensive lapse by South Africa when they failed to deal with a loose ball on the edge of the box. Ethiopia would secure the win thanks to a stunning own goal by Bernard Parker in the 70th minute as he headed the ball into his own net from a free-kick. The 2–1 defeat ended South Africa's qualification hopes and assured Ethiopia passage to the third and final round of qualifying. However, following the match it emerged that Ethiopia were under investigation for fielding an ineligible player during their 2–1 win over Botswana and that they could face losing the 3 points and have the result reversed to a 3–0 defeat, as in line with FIFA sanctions. This would give South Africa an outside chance of qualifying for Brazil. Ethiopia later admitted to the error. On Tuesday, 19 June, it was reported in the South African press that Ethiopia had again fielded the same player against South Africa with the player still to serve his one-match ban and it might be possible that Ethiopia could face losing another 3 points to South Africa. Should this happen, South Africa would then qualify for the next round at the expense of Ethiopia.

South Africa failed to qualify. These were the final standings:

2014–2016 
South Africa's first match under new coach, Ephraim Mashaba was a Group A qualifying match for AFCON 2015, played at Al-Merrikh Stadium against Sudan on 5 September 2014. South Africa won the match 3–0 with two goals from Sibusiso Vilakazi in the 55th and 61st minutes and a goal from Bongani Ndulula in the 78th minute. South Africa's second match in the AFCON qualifiers was a home match at Cape Town Stadium against Nigeria on 10 September. South Africa held off the defending AFCON champions for a 0–0 draw. Following these two matches, Bafana Bafana moved up two places to 67th in the FIFA world ranking.

South Africa then took on Congo at the Stade Municipal de Pointe-Noire on 11 October. The game was won 2–0 with goals from Bongani Ndulula and Tokelo Rantie in the second half. This victory brought South Africa to the top of Group A. Next was the return match in Polokwane's Peter Mokaba Stadium. The game ended in a 0–0 stalemate which kept South Africa at the top of the group. Following these two matches, South Africa climbed ten places in the FIFA rankings to no. 57.

Next up was the second match against Sudan on 15 November which was won 2–1, with goals from Thulani Serero in the 37th minute, and Tokelo Rantie in the 54th minute. The game was originally scheduled to be played at the Mbombela Stadium in Nelspruit, but it was moved to the Moses Mabhida Stadium in Durban in honour of captain and goalkeeper, Senzo Meyiwa who was shot and killed two weeks prior to the game. Coach Ephraim Mashaba said the win was for the fallen hero, who had not conceded a goal in the four qualifiers he had played. The result sealed qualification for South Africa, with an away game versus Nigeria to spare. It was the first time since 2008 that Bafana managed to qualify for the tournament (in 2013 they qualified as hosts after Libya exchanged their rights for security reasons).

The last game of the qualifiers was on 19 November at the Akwa Ibom Stadium in Uyo, Nigeria. It ended 2–2, therefore eliminating Nigeria and denying them the chance to defend their crown at 2015 AFCON. The coach Ephraim Mashaba had earlier said that South Africa would not do Nigeria any favours. It showed in the way that the South Africans approached the match. Tokelo Rantie missed a sitter in the fourth minute when he fluffed his chance over the bar, but he made amends when he opened the scoring in the 42nd minute after a neat pass from Dean Furman. It looked as if South Africa would get their first competitive win over Nigeria when Rantie doubled his and his country's tally in the 48th minute. But it wasn't to be, as they failed to hold on for a historic win. Nigeria came back to draw 2–2 but it wasn't enough to secure Nigeria's qualification as Congo beat Sudan 1–0 to book their place at the tournament.

Under Mashaba, South Africa failed to qualify for the 2017 Africa Cup of Nations. This, in addition to the various controversies, disparaging remarks that Mashaba allegedly made about SAFA top officials, his supposedly arrogant nature and his ill-treatment of overseas-based stars, led to his suspension after leading South Africa to a 2−1 victory over Senegal in a 2018 FIFA World Cup qualifier.

2017–present: promising generation 
After being unable to reach the 2018 FIFA World Cup, South Africa had undergone a systematic reformation and transformation to regain its status as an African soccer power. The reformation of South African soccer was aided by the successful rise of its under-age soccer, including the U-17, U-20 and U-23 teams that all achieved some African successes and participated in World tournaments at their levels.

South Africa qualified for the 2019 Africa Cup of Nations finishing second and undefeated, with a shock 2–0 away win over Nigeria. South Africa participated in the tournament grouped with Morocco, Ivory Coast and Namibia, and narrowly qualified to the knockout stage with only a single 1–0 win over Namibia and had to face host Egypt (which had Mohamed Salah), winners of AFCON seven times and had just qualified for Russia 2018 World Cup. The South Africans then pulled out the biggest upset in the tournament, knocking Egypt out in the round of 16 stage with a 1–0 win in Cairo. Then, South Africa once again faced Nigeria in the quarter-finals, but there was no further upset as Nigeria prevailed 2–1, but it was regarded as South Africa's best performance in the 2010s.

Under Molefi Ntseki, South Africa failed to qualify for the 2021 Africa Cup of Nations. Molefi Ntseki was promptly sacked and the Hugo Broos was announced as his replacement.

Broos immediately set out to restructure the national team and the veteran players (Including captain Thulani Hlatshwayo) of the team were replaced with an exciting and young crop of players. Goalkeeper Ronwen Williams was named as the captain with Percy Tau being named as the vice-captain.

Broos' efforts led South Africa to put in a credible performance in the second round of African qualifiers for the 2022 FIFA World Cup, where South Africa were placed in a group with Ghana, Zimbabwe, and Ethiopia. South Africa got off to a promising start, beating a weakened Ghana side 1–0 at home on Matchday 2 and going to the top of the group. South Africa remained at the top of the group until the final matchday when they lost 0–1 away to Ghana after a dubious penalty was awarded to Ghana in the first half. South Africa ultimately finished second to Ghana on goals scored, narrowly missing out on qualification for the final 10-team playoff round to qualify for the World Cup.

Team image

Nickname
"Bafana Bafana" is a nickname given to the national side by its fans. It is Swati and translates literally as "the boys, the boys". Its actual meaning in Nguni language is, "Go boys! Go boys!", though others take the double use of "Bafana" to mean "all of the boys"---the team and management, as well as the spectators; togetherness, as in the African concept of ubuntu.

In July 1992, at Kings Park stadium in Durban, fans shouted "Bafana Bafana" [GO BOYS GO BOYS] when South Africa was on the verge of beating Cameroon and after the game. A group of three journalists, from South Africa newspaper The Sowetan, then began to use the name in print when referring to the team. The name was initially used only informally, as SAFA felt that it was not commercially viable, and that it was degrading to refer to a team of men as boys.

Standton Woodrush Ltd applied to trademark the name in 1993. The trademark was granted but was for clothing only. In 1994, the team's technical sponsor at the time, Kappa, applied for the trademarks "Bafana" and "Bafana Bafana" in class 25. These were granted and subsequently passed on to SAFA. In 1997, SAFA filed for the trademark "Bafana Bafana" for all goods and services, in all classes.

SAFA then applied to have Standton Woodrush Ltd removed from the trademarks register, on the grounds that SAFA was the rightful owner of the name. The case was dismissed on the ground that SAFA was not an interested person within the meaning of this term as used in the Trade Marks Act No. 94 of 1993, which provides that only an interested party has legal standing to seek relief.

SAFA made another application to gain ownership of the trademark, with the second application going to the Appeal Court. The court again found that SAFA did not have the necessary grounds for ownership of the name in all classes. The court held that an intention to use a mark does not create a preference for registration, and that the proprietor of a trademark need not be its originator.

In 2011 SAFA paid R5 million to Standton Woodrush Ltd for rights to the name "Bafana Bafana", in class 25 and all other classes.

Home stadium

The South Africa national soccer team does not use a single stadium as its home stadium for matches. Instead, they use a variety of stadiums throughout South Africa to host matches.

The largest venue used is the 94,700-seater Soccer City in Soweto, outside Johannesburg. Other often used venues include the Atteridgeville Super Stadium, outside Pretoria, the Royal Bafokeng Stadium, outside Rustenburg, the Free State Stadium in Bloemfontein and Moses Mabhida Stadium in Durban.

Matches have also been hosted at Ellis Park and Johannesburg Stadium in Johannesburg, Kings Park in Durban, Olympia Park in Rustenburg, Cape Town Stadium and Newlands Stadium in Cape Town, Nelson Mandela Bay Stadium and the EPRU Stadium in Port Elizabeth, Loftus Versfeld in Pretoria, Orlando Stadium in Soweto, Mbombela Stadium in Nelspruit, Peter Mokaba Stadium in Polokwane, Griqua Park in Kimberley, Jan Smuts Stadium and Buffalo City Stadium in East London, Odi Stadium in Mabopane, Mmabatho Stadium in Mafikeng, Atlantic Stadium in Witbank and Olen Park in Potchefstroom.

The team has also hosted matches outside of South Africa. In preparation for the 1998 FIFA World Cup, the team hosted a friendly in Baiersbronn, Germany. As a warm-up for the 2002 FIFA World Cup, the team hosted a friendly at Mong Kok Stadium in Hong Kong. In 2006 the team hosted a Nelson Mandela Challenge match at Griffin Park, in London, England. During their preparations for the 2010 FIFA World Cup, the team hosted two matches in Germany. The matches were played at the BRITA-Arena in Wiesbaden and the Stadion am Bieberer Berg in Offenbach am Main.

Media coverage
The South African Football Association owns the rights to national team matches played in South Africa. SAFA currently has a contract with the South African Broadcasting Corporation, to broadcast these matches. It is up to the SABC to procure the rights to matches played outside of the country.

The SABC usually shows most national team games, though they have often had problems with broadcasting weekday matches. They have previously used delayed live footage, and sometimes not shown matches.

Most large tournaments in which the team play, such as the FIFA World Cup and Africa Cup of Nations, have separate broadcast rights. SuperSport purchase the pay TV rights to these tournaments, thus during these tournaments, they also show South African matches. The SABC usually holds the free to air rights to these tournaments, with the notable exception being the 2002 FIFA World Cup. Those matches were shown by e.tv.

Sponsors
When the team returned to international soccer in 1992, their kit was supplied by an Italian clothing company, Kappa. The team wore Kappa kits up to and during the 1998 FIFA World Cup.

Following the 1998 World Cup, the kits for all South African national soccer teams were supplied by German sports apparel company Adidas. The sponsorship deal is believed to be worth Rs 14 million per year. Their contract with the South African Football Association ran until the end of 2010.

On 7 June 2011, SAFA announced Puma as its new technical sponsor and unveiled Bafana Bafana's new kit.

In October 2013, ABSA announced its resignation as a sponsor of SAFA and the South African national team as of the end of their contract in December 2013. This was followed a week later by the announcement from Puma, that they too would step down as technical sponsors of Bafana Bafana.

From March 2014 until June 2020, the official kit provider was the American sporting apparel company Nike from the international friendly match against Brazil.

Since June 2020, the official kit provider has been French sporting apparel company Le Coq Sportif.

The team now has one main sponsor, Castle Lager, a brand owned by South African Breweries. Smaller sponsors and suppliers include Energade and Tsogo Sun Hotels.

In 2022, Banxso became the official online trading partner for the team.

Results and fixtures

The following matches were played in the last 12 months or are scheduled to be played.

2022

2023

Coaching staff

Coaching history
Caretaker managers are listed in italics.

 Alan Rogers (1963)
 Jeff Butler (1992)
 Stanley Tshabalala (1992)
 Ephraim Mashaba (1992)
 Augusto Palacios (1992–93)
 Clive Barker (1994–97)
 Jomo Sono (1998)
 Philippe Troussier (1998)
 Trott Moloto (1998–00)
 Carlos Queiroz (2000–02)
 Ephraim Mashaba (2001)
 Trott Moloto (2002)
 Jomo Sono (2002)
 Ephraim Mashaba (2002–04, 2014–16)
 Jomo Sono (2003)
 April Phumo (2004)
 Stuart Baxter (2004–05, 2017–19)
 Ted Dumitru (2005–06)
 Pitso Mosimane (2006)
 Carlos Alberto Parreira (2007–08, 2009–10)
 Joel Santana (2008–09)
 Pitso Mosimane (2010–12)
 Steve Komphela (2012)
 Gordon Igesund (2012–14)
 Molefi Ntseki (2019–21)
 Hugo Broos (2021–22, 2022–present)
 Helman Mkhalele (2021–22)

Players

Current squad
The following players were called-up in the preliminary squad for the 2023 Africa Cup of Nations qualification matches against Liberia (twice) on 24 and 28 March 2023.

Caps and goals correct as of 27 September 2022, after the match against Botswana.

Recent call-ups
The following players were called up to a squad in the last 12 months. Caps and goals relate to the time at which the matches were played.

Past squads

Africa Cup of Nations
1996 African Cup of Nations
1998 African Cup of Nations
2000 African Cup of Nations
2002 African Cup of Nations
2004 African Cup of Nations
2006 Africa Cup of Nations
2008 Africa Cup of Nations
2013 Africa Cup of Nations
2015 Africa Cup of Nations
2019 Africa Cup of Nations

FIFA Confederations Cup
1997 FIFA Confederations Cup
2009 FIFA Confederations Cup
FIFA World Cup
1998 FIFA World Cup
2002 FIFA World Cup
2010 FIFA World Cup
CONCACAF Gold Cup
2005 CONCACAF Gold Cup

Records

Aaron Mokoena became the first, and to date only, South African player to reach 100 caps on 31 May 2010, against Guatemala; to celebrate he wore a kit with the number 100 on the back.

Players in bold text are still active with South Africa.

Most appearances

Top goalscorers

  Victor Letsoalo is the first and only player to have scored a hat-trick for South Africa in his debut 	 in 2021 July 13

List of South Africa hat-tricks

Key

Competitive record

FIFA World Cup

Although South Africa has made three appearances in the World Cup, they have not made it past the first round. The team's first attempt to qualify was for the 1994 World Cup. The team finished second in their group, behind Nigeria, who went on to play at the World Cup.

Their first appearance was in France 1998, six years after they had been readmitted to FIFA. Despite a 3–0 drubbing to France in their opening game, they went on to draw against Denmark and Saudi Arabia; the team finished third and thus exited the tournament. Korea/Japan 2002 was expected to be an opportunity for Bafana Bafana to step up to the next level, but they were eliminated at the group stage despite drawing to Paraguay and beating Slovenia 1–0 for their first-ever World Cup win. The team finished third in their group, losing out to Paraguay on goal difference.

The team failed to qualify for the 2006 World Cup after finishing third in their qualifying group. Ghana won the group and progressed to the tournament, while Congo DR finished ahead of South Africa on head-to-head results. During the 2010 World Cup in South Africa, they beat France 2–1 and drew 1–1 to Mexico, but lost 0–3 to Uruguay. They failed to advance to the round of 16, on goal difference, for their second World Cup in a row and as the first host country to fail to advance past the group stage.

FIFA Confederations Cup

Africa Cup of Nations

*Red border color indicates tournament was held on home soil.

African Nations Championship record

All-time record against other nations
As of 27 September 2022 after match against

By Federation

Honours
Africa Cup of Nations
 Winner (1):  1996
 Runner-up (1):  1998
 Third Place (1):  2000
FIFA Confederations Cup
 Fourth Place (1): 2009
FIFA Best Mover of the Year
 Winner (1): 1996
Afro-Asian Cup of Nations
 Winner (1): 1997
COSAFA Cup
 Winner (5): 2002, 2007, 2008;; 2016, 2021
 Third Place (4): 2000, 2005, 2009, 2013

−In 2008 and 2009, SAFA sent a 'Development XI' to the COSAFA Cup. These matches thus do not count towards the senior national team's records.

References

External links

South Africa FA official website

 
S
African national association football teams